The 1980 Winter Olympics, officially the XIII Olympic Winter Games and also known as Lake Placid 1980, were an international multi-sport event held from February 13 to 24, 1980, in Lake Placid, New York, United States. 

Lake Placid was elected as the host city for the 1980 Winter Games at the 75th International Olympic Committee (IOC) Session in Vienna, Austria in 1974. This marked the second time the Upstate New York village hosted the Winter Games, after 1932. The only other candidate city to bid for the 1980 games, Vancouver-Garibaldi withdrew before the final vote.

Some venues from the 1932 Games were renovated for use in the 1980 Games, and events were held at the Olympic Center, Whiteface Mountain, Mt. Van Hoevenberg Olympic Bobsled Run, the Olympic Ski Jumps, the Cascade Cross Country Ski Center, and the Lake Placid High School Speed Skating Oval. The Games were a success in terms of sport, but the organization was criticized because of numerous transport problems. The 1980 Games were the last to take place in a city of less than 15,000 inhabitants.

The Lake Placid Winter Olympics brought together 1,072 athletes from 37 countries to take part in six  sports and 10 disciplines comprising a total of 38 official events (one more than in  1976).  People's Republic of China,  Cyprus and  Costa Rica participated in the Winter Olympic Games for the first time. The American speed skater Eric Heiden set the record for most medals for an athlete in one edition of the Winter Olympic Games after he medaled in all five  speed skating events. The Olympic  ice hockey saw the young American team defeat the Soviet favorites in what became known as the Miracle on Ice, on their way to the gold medal. In the other disciplines, the Soviet Nikolaj Zimjatov won three gold medals in  cross-country skiing and the Liechtenstein skier Hanni Wenzel won her country's first two gold medals in  alpine skiing. The Soviet Union finished first in the medal standings, with ten gold medals, while East Germany won the most medals overall, 23. The United States was third on both counts.

Context

Selection of the host city 
After Lake Placid hosted the 1932 Olympic Winter Games, the community continued to bid on upcoming editions of the Games, submitting seven total bid attempts, including  1948,  1952,  1956. Three of these were supported by the United States Olympic Committee and presented to the International Olympic Committee:  1968,  1976 and 1980. Until 1980, each of the bid attempts failed, either due to falling short of gaining support at the national level, or during the IOC vote. When Denver withdrew after being selected to host the 1976 Winter Games, the USOC initially supported Salt Lake City to replace Denver. But on January 26, 1973, the Salt Lake City bid collapsed due to unsecured financial backing and discontent by Utah residents. Lake Placid organizers submitted a late bid to host the 1976 Games to the IOC in February 1973, with the support of the USOC. The IOC selected Innsbruck, Austria to host the 1976 Games in place of Denver, with Lake Placid finishing as the runner-up. IOC President Lord Killanin later stated that members of the IOC executive favored the Austrian bid as a way to "make peace with the people of Austria" over the decision in 1972 to declare Austrian skiing star Karl Schranz ineligible for the games as a professional athlete.

Undeterred, Lake Placid re-submitted the materials for the 1976 bid for the 1980 Winter Games, secured the support of the United States Olympic Committee on November 20, 1973, and made the official bid in September 1974. The United States Olympic Committee, embarrassed by Denver's 1976 withdrawal, required Lake Placid's bid to be widely supported by residents and government. Lake Placid satisfied the USOC requirements, with a referendum held in October 1973 garnering 75 per cent support for hosting the games, a joint resolution of the New York Legislature, a joint resolution from the Congress of the United States, a letter of support from the Governor of New York and the President of the United States. Lake Placid also secured the support of the environmental groups Sierra Club and Adirondack Mountain Club.

Three other cities declared themselves candidates for the 1980 Winter Games: Vancouver—Garibaldi (Canada), Lahti (Finland) and Chamonix (France).  The bids for Lahti and Chamonix were withdrawn early in the bid process, and Vancouver, which was unable obtain the support of the Government of British Columbia, withdrew its candidacy on October 4, 1974.  The members of the IOC awarded the 1980 Winter Games to Lake Placid on October 23, 1974 during the 75th IOC Session in Vienna.

International political context 
The Lake Placid Games took place in the shadow of the Cold War with a number of other complex international events occurring in the lead up to the games. In November 1979, Sixty-two Americans were taken hostage at the United States Embassy in Tehran by Iranian militants, a situation that would not resolve until after the Games. In December 1979, the Soviet Union began the invasion of Afghanistan, which led to United States President Jimmy Carter calling for the international boycott of the 1980 Summer Games in Moscow. The Western governments first considered the idea of boycotting the Moscow 1980 Summer Olympics in response to the situation in Afghanistan at the 20 December 1979 meeting of NATO representatives. The idea was not completely new to the world: in the mid 1970s, proposals for an Olympic boycott circulated widely among human rights activists and groups as a sanction for Soviet violations of human rights. At that time, very few member governments expressed interest in the proposal. However, this idea gained popularity in early January 1980 when Soviet nuclear scientist and dissident Andrei Sakharov called for a boycott. On 14 January 1980, the Carter Administration joined Sakharov's appeal and set a deadline by which the Soviet Union must pull out of Afghanistan or face the consequences, including an international boycott of the games. On 26 January 1980, Canadian Prime Minister Joe Clark announced that Canada, like the US, would boycott the Olympic Games if Soviet forces did not leave Afghanistan by 20 February 1980. Carter also proposed moving the Olympics to Greece on a permanent basis to eliminate the issue of politicisation of the Games' hosting, but the International Olympic Committee (IOC) rejected this idea. Ultimately, 66 nations would boycott the 1980 Summer Olympics, but this did not impact the Lake Placid Games.

Another ongoing international situation was the conflict between People's Republic of China and Taiwan. Taiwan competed under the name of "Republic of China" and with its national flag until the 1976 Winter Games. In October 1979, the International Olympic Committee recognized the Olympic Committee of the People's Republic of China after threats from China to withdraw from the Games, and forced Taiwan to take the name "Chinese Taipei" and to adopt a new flag for the 1980 Games. The decision was appealed to Swiss court, and was upheld on January 15, 1980. The Taiwanese delegation refused to comply with the IOC's decision and arrived at the Olympic Village with the same flag and the same name as before. After being refused entry, the Taiwan team canceled their participation in the Games. The People's Republic of China, which threatened to withdraw if Taiwan participated under the name of "Republic of China", took part in its first Olympic Games since 1952 and the first Winter Games in its history.

Organization

Organizing Committee 
The Lake Placid Olympic Organizing Committee (LPOOC) was established as a not-for-profit corporation in December 1974. It's board of directors was made up of 48 people, with a 13 member executive board. Ron MacKenzie, who was instrumental in developing the region and securing the Games, was the chair of the organizing committee when it was founded. He died in December 1978, fourteen months before the start of the Games. J. Bernard Fell was the chairman of the board of directors and Art Devlin was the vice-chairman. The LPOOC's vision for the Games was a simple Games that would return to the basics of the Olympic movement.

Finances 
The budget for the 1980 Winter Olympic Games grew from an initial projection of $30 million, to a total of  million. The cost of the games was financed by three parties, the Federal government ($82.7 million), the State of New York ($32.4 million), and the organizing committee ($53.6 million). In the 2016 study of cost overruns at Olympic Games at Oxford University, researchers found the Lake Placid Winter Olympic Games had the largest cost overruns of any Winter Games at 324 per cent above the planned cost. The budget overruns were attributed to environmental protection measures, additional work undertaken to modernize existing facilities, overly optimistic cost estimates, and inflation. The Games ended with a deficit of $8.5 million. After a request for funds and the authorities' refusal, the organizing committee saw no other option but to declare bankruptcy, but in January 1981 the Governor of New York announced that the remaining deficit would be paid by New York State.

The construction was financed by the Federal government and the State of New York at a total cost of $92 million including $22.7 million for the Olympic Village, $16.9 million for the Olympic Center, more than $15 million for the alpine ski center of Whiteface Mountain, $7.9 million for the facilities of Mont Van Hoevenberg (cross-country skiing, bobsleigh and biathlon), $5.4 million for the ski jumps and $5.3 million for the bobsled run. Additional costs included transport improvements totaling $4.8 million, the extension of the electricity and hydroelectric network at $2.7 million, and construction for the headquarters of the New York State Police at $3.8 million. In addition, $8 million was allocated for security costs. The expenses of the organizing committee were mainly administrative totaling $48.1 million, and for press and broadcasting centers.

The increasing costs for the Games and charges of nepotism and mismanagement resulted in a federal auditor investigating the LPOOC. Public questions regarding accounting practices and contract awards resulted in the LPOOC's marketing director to be replaced. Further scrutiny came when another director was asked to resign when it became public they had not filed income taxes for a number of years. The company awarded the food management contract for the Games came under federal investigation for associations with organized crime.

Revenue for the LPOOC came primarily from sponsorship contracts signed with more than 200 companies totaling around $30 million in cash, goods or services, and from the sale of broadcasting rights totaling $21 million and included $8 million donated to the IOC.

Around 550,000 tickets were distributed for the 1980 Winter Olympic Games. Ticket distribution to the public included different regions of the United States (65.8%), Canada (6%) and other countries (8.2%). The remainder was distributed among sponsors and suppliers (8.7%), the US Olympic committee, the organizing committee, authorities, donors and authorized companies (10.1%) or kept in reserve (1.2 %). The public prices for tickets ranged from $15 to $70.

Security 
Security for the Lake Placid Winter Games was provided by the New York State Police and 26 other agencies including the Federal Bureau of Investigation. The organizing committee also hired the private security company Pinkerton National Detective Agency. The security headquarters were located at Ray Brook, which also was the site of the Olympic Village. Police officers were trained in hostage negotiation techniques and various sensors were installed to detect any terrorist attack. A four meter double barrier was erected surrounding the Olympic Village.

Transportation 
The Lake Placid Winter Games were plagued with transportation problems complicating the planning and operations of the Games. The small mountain community did not have the accommodation or resources to handle the expected 50,000 spectators were expected each day. Most of the accommodation within the community was reserved for Games officials, athlete's families, meaning spectators commuted as much as 90 miles daily to attend events. Anticipating these challenges, the LPOOC prohibited private cars from entering Lake Placid for the duration of the Games. Instead the LPOOC provided car parks and a shuttle system to transport spectators to the competition venues, and hired 60 taxis and 300 coaches, instead of the 450 initially planned, to be available to athletes, coaches, officials and VIPs.

The first evidence that the Games would be plagued with transportation issues came with the February 1979 pre-Olympic ski jumping competition which saw spectators create an 11 mile traffic jam. Once the Games started, the inadequate transportation planning was evident quickly as American and Soviet athletes arrived late for the opening ceremony. Throughout the Games the main street of Lake Placid was often blocked by traffic jams, and journalists, spectators and athletes found long waits at bus stops. Spectators were often left stranded either missing events or unable to return home from events. After five days, the Governor of New York Hugh Carey declared a partial state of emergency to address the issues.

The LPOOC attributed the transportation challenges, among other things, to the lack of communication with transport companies and the State.

Visual identity 
The  Emblem of the 1980 Olympic Winter Games contains several symbols. The right part is reminiscent of the mountains surrounding Lake Placid and the left part is a stylized  Ionic Column that refers to Ancient Olympics. The indentation at the top of the column represents two basins which symbolize the two editions of the Games organized in Lake Placid. On the Games poster, the Olympic rings overhang this emblem.

Highlights 

Notable highlights included:
 The United States men's ice hockey team, composed mostly of collegiate players and not predicted to advance beyond group play, won the gold medal. The United States team's 4–3 win over the veteran and professional Soviet team, which came into the 1980 Games having won four consecutive Olympic gold medals, became known as the "Miracle on Ice" in American popular culture. The win captured the hearts of Americans, even though it was the win against Finland that secured the gold medal.
Eric Heiden of the United States won gold in the 500m, 1000m, 1500m, 5000m, and 10,000m speed skating events, setting four Olympic records and one world record (10,000m) in the process and delivering 83% of the American gold medals (the only other gold, as noted above, was won by the hockey team). Heiden became the first person to win all five speed skating events, the first of only three to win five gold medals in individual events at a single Games (either Summer or Winter), and is still the only athlete to win five gold medals at one Winter Games.
 Sweden's Ingemar Stenmark won both the giant slalom and the slalom.
 Hanni Wenzel won the women's giant slalom and slalom, making Liechtenstein the smallest country to produce an Olympic champion.
 Ulrich Wehling of East Germany and Irina Rodnina of the USSR won their respective events for the third time, Wehling in Nordic combined and Rodnina in pairs figure skating.
 Aleksandr Tikhonov of the USSR earned his fourth straight gold medal as part of the 4 × 7.5 km biathlon relay team.
 Nikolay Zimyatov of the USSR earned three gold medals in cross-country skiing.
 Robin Cousins won gold for Great Britain in the men's singles figure skating.
 East Germany won the most medals overall (23) but had fewer golds (9) than the USSR (10).
 In possibly the most dramatic duel of the games, Sweden's Thomas Wassberg edged Finland's Juha Mieto in the 15 km cross-country skiing by 0.01 seconds, the closest margin of victory ever in Olympic cross-country skiing.
 Although they did not get any medals, the People's Republic of China entered the Olympic Games for the first time after the IOC agreed to designate the Republic of China "Chinese Taipei".
 Lake Placid 1980 marked the first use of artificial snow in Olympic competition.

Sports 

There were 38 events contested in 6 sports (10 disciplines). See the medal winners, ordered by sport:

Venues 

Intervales Ski-Hill – Nordic combined (ski jumping), Ski jumping
Lake Placid Equestrian Stadium – Opening Ceremony
Lake Placid Olympic Sports Complex Cross Country Biathlon Center – Biathlon, Cross-country skiing, Nordic combined (Cross-country skiing)
Mt. Van Hoevenberg Bob and Luge Run – Bobsleigh, Luge (separate tracks)
Olympic Center – Figure skating, Ice hockey, Closing ceremonies
James B. Sheffield Speed Skating Oval – Speed skating
Whiteface Mountain – Alpine skiing

The former Will Rogers Memorial Hospital was briefly used as press headquarters.

The site was considered ideal for the available infrastructure from the 1932 Winter Olympics, most notably the Bobsleigh run. The existing facilities meant the Olympics could be staged on a reasonable budget and with limited environmental impact. It was not just a matter of convenience, either, according to Lake Placid's congressman, Representative Robert McEwen. “It is no secret to us in America that the measure of federal support given to athletes in Communist countries (so that they win medals and improve the countries' image abroad) is on a level unknown to us here in America,” he told Congress.” This would be a step in the right direction, a worthy investment in American winter athletes.” 

The local Olympic committee needed congressional approval for funding to build the Olympic Village. Congress required an after use contract for facilities, and it was agreed that the Olympic Village would be built in accordance to Federal Bureau of Prisons needs. Following the Olympic Games, it was repurposed for Federal Correctional Institution, Ray Brook.

Medal count 

These are the top ten nations that won medals at the 1980 Winter Games.

Participating nations 
37 NOCs participated.

Cyprus made their Olympic debut at the games. The People's Republic of China and Costa Rica both made their Winter Olympic debut. The Republic of China refused to attend both the Summer Games in Montreal, the Winter Games in Lake Placid and the Summer Games in Moscow over the IOC's recognition of the People's Republic of China as "China", and its request for the Republic of China to compete as "Chinese Taipei". The PRC, on the other hand, returned to the Olympics for the first time since 1952 and made its Winter Olympic debut, however then boycotting the 1980 Moscow Summer Olympics.

Mascot 

Roni is the Olympic mascot of these Games, created by Don Moss. The mascot is a racoon, which is a familiar animal from the mountainous region of the Adirondacks where Lake Placid is situated. The name Roni comes from the word racoon in Iroquoian, the language of the native people from the region of the State of New York and Lake Placid and was chosen by Lake Placid school children.

Theme song 
The official theme song for the 1980 Winter Olympics was "Give It All You Got" by the American flugelhorn player Chuck Mangione, who performed the song (along with the song "Piña Colada") live at the Closing Ceremony, with the Hamilton Philharmonic Orchestra (Canada).

See also 

 Adirondack Railway: provided train service from Utica, New York, to Lake Placid
 2023 Winter Universiade

Notes 
Notes

Citations

Official reports
 
 

Works cited

External links 

 
 Lake Placid Olympic Regional Development Authority
 
 Personal travelogue of the Games 
 The program of the 1980 Lake Placid Winter Olympics
 

 
Winter Olympics by year
Olympic Games in the United States
Winter multi-sport events in the United States
Olympic Games in New York (state)
Olympics
Olympics
Olympics, Winter
Olympics
February 1980 sports events in the United States
1980 in sports in New York (state)